The 2006 NCAA Division I Men's Golf Championship was a golf tournament contested from May 31 to June 3, 2006 at the Crosswater Club in Sunriver, Oregon. It was the 68th NCAA Division I Men's Golf Championship. The team championship was won by the Oklahoma State Cowboys who captured their tenth national championship (and first since 2000) by three strokes over the Florida Gators. The individual national championship was won by Jonathan Moore, also from Oklahoma State.

Venue
This was the first NCAA Division I Men's Golf Championship hosted at the Crosswater Club in Sunriver, Oregon.

References

NCAA Men's Golf Championship
Golf in Oregon
NCAA Division I Men's Golf Championship
NCAA Division I Men's Golf Championship
NCAA Division I Men's Golf Championship
NCAA Division I Men's Golf Championship
NCAA Division I Men's Golf Championship